Stanislav Vasilyevich Moskvin (born 19 January 1939) is a retired Russian cyclist and cycling coach. He competed at the 1960, 1964 and 1968 Olympics in the 4000 m individual and team pursuit. In 1960 he won a bronze medal in the team competition; in 1964 he finished in fifth place, both individually and with a team, and in 1968 his team finished fourth.

Between 1962 and 1970 he won four world titles with the Soviet team and five silver and bronze medals in the individual and team pursuit. He also won 18 national titles (1958–1969), as well as the Peace Race in 1961 and 1962 in the team competition.

After retirement he coached the national teams of the Soviet Union (1971–1973), Algeria (1974–1980) and Colombia (1995–1999). Between 1980 and 1983 he headed the cycling federation of Saint Petersburg and between 1984 and 1988 the club Burevestnik, for which he competed before. For his achievements he was awarded the Medal "For Distinguished Labour" and Medal "For Labour Valour".

References

1939 births
Living people
Olympic cyclists of the Soviet Union
Cyclists at the 1960 Summer Olympics
Cyclists at the 1964 Summer Olympics
Cyclists at the 1968 Summer Olympics
Soviet male cyclists
Russian male cyclists
Olympic medalists in cycling
Olympic bronze medalists for the Soviet Union
Cyclists from Saint Petersburg
Medalists at the 1960 Summer Olympics